Nelson Ribeiro (14 January 1910 – 22 July 1973) was a Brazilian rower. He competed in the men's coxed four at the 1936 Summer Olympics.

References

1910 births
1973 deaths
Brazilian male rowers
Olympic rowers of Brazil
Rowers at the 1936 Summer Olympics
Rowers from Rio de Janeiro (city)